Evan Ziporyn (b. Chicago, Illinois, December 14, 1959) is an American composer of post-minimalist music with a cross-cultural orientation, drawing equally from classical music, avant-garde, various world music traditions, and jazz.  Ziporyn has composed for a wide range of ensembles, including symphony orchestras, wind ensembles, many types of chamber groups, and solo works, sometimes involving electronics. Balinese gamelan, for which he has composed numerous works, has compositions. He is known for his solo performances on clarinet and bass clarinet; additionally, Ziporyn plays gender wayang and other Balinese instruments, saxophones, piano & keyboards, EWI, and Shona mbira.

Ziporyn is the Kenan Sahin Distinguished Professor of Music at the Massachusetts Institute of Technology as well as director of MIT's Center for Art, Science & Technology (CAST).  At MIT he directs Gamelan Galak Tika, an ensemble he founded in 1993, a group of 30 MIT students, staff and community members, devoted to the study and performance of new works for Balinese Gamelan.

He is currently a member of the Eviyan Trio, with Czech violinist/vocalist Iva Bittovà and American guitarist Gyan Riley.

He has released albums on Cantaloupe, New Albion, New World, Victo, Airplane Ears, and CRI Emergency Music; his works have also been recorded on Naxos, Koch, Innova, and World Village.  As a performer, he has recorded for Nonesuch, Sony Classical, and Point Music, among others.  He has composed music for a wide range of ensembles worldwide, including Yo-Yo Ma's Silk Road Project, the American Composers Orchestra, the Boston Modern Orchestra Project, the Kronos Quartet, Brooklyn Rider, Ethel, cellist Maya Beiser, the Netherlands Wind Ensemble, the MIT Wind Ensemble, Gamelan Sekar Jaya, Sentieri Selvaggi, Gamelan Salukat, and Gamelan Semara Ratih.

Evan Ziporyn was named a 2007 USA Walker Fellow by United States Artists, an arts advocacy foundation dedicated to the support and promotion of America's top living artists.

He was born in Chicago, Illinois and now lives in Lexington, Massachusetts with composer Christine Southworth. He is the brother of Brook Ziporyn and Terra Ziporyn Snider, and has two children, Leonardo Ziporyn and Ava Ziporyn.

Career 

Ziporyn studied at Eastman, Yale and UC Berkeley with Joseph Schwantner, Martin Bresnick, and Gerard Grisey. He first traveled to Bali in 1981, studying with Madé Lebah, Colin McPhee's 1930s musical informant. He returned on a Fulbright in 1987.  While living on the west coast during the 1980s he was a member of Gamelan Sekar Jaya.  The three compositions he composed for Sekar Jaya all included western instruments.

He performed a clarinet solo at the First Bang on a Can Marathon in New York. His involvement with BOAC continued for 25 years: in 1992 he co-founded the Bang on a Can All-stars (Musical America's 2005 Ensemble of the Year), with whom he toured the globe and premiered over 100 commissioned works, collaborating with Nik Bartsch, Iva Bittova, Don Byron, Ornette Coleman, Brian Eno, Philip Glass, Meredith Monk, Thurston Moore, Terry Riley and Tan Dun. He co-produced their seminal 1996 recording of Brian Eno's Music for Airports, as well as their 2012 Big Beautiful Dark & Scary (2012). He left the group in the fall of that year to form Eviyan with Iva Bittová and Gyan Riley, with whom he now concertizes and records regularly.  In the fall of 2013 he founded the Critical Band, a group devoted to the music of the late British composer Steve Martland.

Ziporyn joined the MIT faculty in 1990, founding Gamelan Galak Tika there in 1993, and continued a series of compositions for gamelan and western instruments. These include three evening-length works, 2001's ShadowBang, 2004's Oedipus Rex at the American Repertory Theater (Robert Woodruff, director), and 2009's A House in Bali, an opera which joins western singers with Balinese traditional performers, and the All-stars with a full gamelan. It received its world premiere in Bali that summer and its New York premiere at BAM Next Wave in October 2010.

In 1992 Ziporyn founded the Bang on a Can All Stars, with whom he performed and recorded until 2012.  He also was a member of Steve Reich and Musicians, with whom he shared a 1998 Grammy Award for Best Chamber Music Performance.

As a clarinetist, Ziporyn recorded the definitive version of Steve Reich's multi-clarinet New York Counterpoint in 1996, sharing in that ensemble's Grammy Award in 1998. In 2001 his solo clarinet CD, This is Not A Clarinet, made Top Ten lists across the country. His compositions have been commissioned by Yo-Yo Ma's Silk Road Ensemble, Kronos Quartet, American Composers Orchestra, Maya Beiser, So Percussion, Wu Man, and the Boston Modern Orchestra Project, with whom he recorded two CDs, Frog's Eye (2006) and Big Grenadilla/Mumbai (2012). His honors include awards from the Massachusetts Cultural Council (2011), The Herb Alpert Foundation (2011), USA Artists Walker Fellowship (2007), MIT's Kepes Prize (2006), the American Academy of Arts and Letters Goddard Lieberson Fellowship (2004), as well as commissions from Meet the Composer/Commissioning Music USA and the Rockefeller MAP Fund. Recordings of his works have been released on Cantaloupe, Sony Classical, New Albion, New World, Koch, Naxos, Innova, and CRI.

He is Kenan Sahin Distinguished Professor of Music at MIT. He has also been inaugural director of MIT's new Center for Art Science and Technology and still serves as head of Music and Theater Arts at the Center for Art, Science and Technology (CAST). He is also founder and artistic director of Gamelan Galak Tika, and curator of the MIT Sounding performance series.

Recordings 

 Connect4 (2020) CD Nut Trytone Records TT0559-088   Fie Schouten, Jelte Althuis (bass clarinet), Tatiana Koleva vibraphone, Eva van de Poll violoncello
 Eviyan Live
November 2013, Les Disques Victo
Iva Bittova (violin/voice), Gyan Riley (guitar), Evan Ziporyn (clarinet/bass clarinet)
Compositions and improvisations by Bittova, Riley, and Ziporyn

 In My Mind and In My Car
October 2013, Airplane Ears Music
Clarinet / Bass Clarinet performed by Evan Ziporyn
Electronics and composition by Christine Southworth and Evan Ziporyn

 Big Grenadilla / Mumbai
April 2012, Cantaloupe Records 
Big Grenadilla (Evan Ziporyn, bass clarinet) 
Mumbai (Sandeep Das, tabla)
Boston Modern Orchestra Project, Gil Rose, conductor
 
 Frog's Eye
October 2006, Cantaloupe Records
Performed by the Boston Modern Orchestra Project. 
Frog's Eye, The Ornate Zither and the Nomad Flute (Anne Harley, soprano), War Chant , Drill

 Typical Music
November 2005, New Albion Records
Pondok (Sarah Cahill, piano) 
Typical Music (Arden Trio) 
Ngaben (Gamelan Galak Tika w/ New England Conservatory Philharmonia Dante Anzolini, director)
 
 Shadowbang
June 2003, Cantaloupe Records
Bang on a Can All-Stars with Wayan Wija, dalang
 
 This is Not a Clarinet
July 2001, Cantaloupe Records
Partial Truths
Four Impersonations: Honshirabe, Pengrangrang Gede, Thum Nyatiti, Bindu Semara
Three Island Duos by Michael Tenzer
Press Release by David Lang
 
 Evan Ziporyn: Gamelan Galak Tika
May 2000, New World Records
Amok 
Tire Fire
 
 Animal Act
CRI Emergency Music 1993
What She Saw There 
Tree Frog 
Waiting by the Phone 
Walk the Dog
 
 American Works for Balinese Gamelan 
New World Records 1993
Banyuari by Michael Tenzer, Situ Banda by Michael Tenzer, Khayalan Tiga by Wayne Vitale, Aneh Tapi Nyata by Evan Ziporyn, Kekembangan by Nyoman Windha & Evan Ziporyn 
Performed by Gamelan Sekar Jaya

Works

Works for clarinet / bass clarinet 

 Notes to Self (2010) 15' – solo bass clarinet 
 Hive (2007) 17' clarinet quartet – 2 clarinets, 2 bass clarinets 
 Big Grenadilla (2006) 15' – concerto for bass clarinet and chamber orchestra 
 Drill (2002) 10' – concerto for solo bass clarinet with wind ensemble 
 Four Impersonations (1999) 18' – solo clarinet 
Honshirabe (4:00) Bindu Semara (5:30) Thum Nyatiti (2:30) Pengrangrang Gede (5:30)
 Partial Truths (1999) 17' – solo bass clarinet
 Tsmindao Ghmerto (1995) 7' – solo bass clarinet and wind ensemble
 Tsmindao Ghmerto (1994) 4' – solo bass clarinet
 Walk the Dog (1990) 25' – bass clarinet and electronics
 Be-In (1990) 9' – bass clarinet and string quartet
 What She Saw There (1988) 13' – bass clarinet (or cello) and 2 marimbists
 Waiting By The Phone (1986) 12' – solo clarinet
 Two Obsessions (1980) 15' – solo clarinet

Works for gamelan 
 Hujan Arja (2012) 12' – Balinese gamelan semara dana (7-toned gong kebyar)
 Lapanbelas (2010) 18' – Balinese gamelan semara dana (7-toned gong kebyar)
 Bali Tiba (from A House in Bali) (2009) 7' – Balinese gamelan gong kebyar
 Bayu Sabda Idep (2007) 27' – Just Intonation slendro chamber gamelan and chamber string orchestra
 Cu(Bali)Bre (2007) 3'30" – gender wayang duo
 Sabar Gong (2005) 5' (in collaboration w/Lamine Touré) – Balinese gamelan with Senegalese Sabar drums
 Aradhana (2004) 15' – Balinese gamelan with Chinese pipa
 Ngaben (for Sari Club) (2003) 15' – Balinese gamelan & orchestra
 Kebyar Kebyar (2002) 7' – Balinese gamelan gong kebyar 
 Amok! (1996) 32' – six movements for Balinese gamelan, double bass (or cello), percussion sampler, keyboard sampler
 Tire Fire (1994) 25' – Balinese gamelan, two electric guitars, electric bass, and keyboard (or mandolin)
 Aneh Tapi Nyata (1992) 14' – chamber ensemble and Balinese percussion
 Kekembangan (1990) 16' (in collaboration with I Nyoman Windha) – saxophone quartet and Balinese gamelan
 Night Bus (1990) 12' – Sundanese gamelan (commissioned by the Toronto Border Crossings Festival for the Evergreen Club)

Theater 

 A House in Bali (2009) 90' – opera based on the memoir of Colin McPhee, for amplified sextet (gtr, perc, pno, vln, vc, cb), Balinese gamelan, two tenors, one soprano, and four Balinese actors/dancers www.houseinbali.org
 Oedipus Rex (2004) 90' – Greek choruses and onstage incidental music the American Repertory Theater production of the original Sophocles tragedy. Directed by Robert Woodruff, Loeb Theater, Cambridge, MA
 ShadowBang (2001) 90' – full-length theater work for Balinese dalang (shadow puppeteer) and Bang on a Can Allstars.
Commissioned by Rockefeller Multi-Arts Program for I Wayan Wija and Bang on a Can Allstars; premiered October 2001 at MIT Kresge Auditorium, Cambridge, and MassMOCA, North Adams, MA

Orchestra 

 Tabla Concerto: Mumbai (2011) 25' – tabla solo, strings and percussion
commissioned by Meet the Composer
 Hard Drive (2007) 18' – orchestra with electric guitar
 Bayu Sabda Idep (2007) 27' – chamber string orchestra with gamelan
 Big Grenadilla (2006) 15' – orchestra and solo bass clarinet
 War Chant (2004) 15' – orchestra with Hawaiian-style lap-steel guitar
commissioned by Boston Modern Orchestra Project
 Ngaben (for Sari Club) (2003) 15' – orchestra with gamelan 
commissioned by the New England Conservatory; world premiere Jordan Hall, Boston, March 12, 2003 by Gamelan Galak Tika and the NEC Symphony, Dante Anzolini, conductor
 Frog's Eye (2002) 13' – chamber orchestra
commissioned and premiered by Boston Pro Arte Orchestra, Isaiah Jackson, conductor, October 2002
 Filling Station (1986) 12' – orchestra premiered by UC Berkeley Symphony, EZ conductor, October 1986
 Pleasureville, Pain City (1985) 6' – premiered by UC Berkeley Symphony, John Sackett, conductor, February 1985

Wind ensemble 

The Ornate Zither and the Nomad Flute (2005) 15' – for solo soprano and wind ensemble
premiered March 2005 by Anne Harley with MIT Wind Ensemble, Fred Harris, director
Commissioned by Richard Nordlof.
 Drill (2002) 10' – concerto for solo bass clarinet with wind ensemble 
premiered by EZ and MIT WindEnsemble, Fred Harris, director
 Tsmindao Ghmerto (1995) 7' – solo bass clarinet and wind ensemble
commissioned and premiered by Nederlands Blazers, New Years Day 1996
 Houtman's Men in Buleleng (1996) 15'
for Orkest de Volharding, premiered at Ijsbreker, Amsterdam

Chamber music

Standard ensembles 

 Where Was I? (2008) 25' – cello, piano, percussion
 Hive (2007) 17' – clarinet quartet – 2 clarinets, 2 bass clarinets
 Speak, At-man! (2006) 10' – alto flute and piano
 Breathing Space (2003) 20' – three movements for string quartet
 commissioned and premiered by Ethel, Miller Theater, New York, April 2003
 Typical Music (2000) 30' – three movements for piano trio
 commissioned by Reader's Digest/Meet the Composer and the Sun Valley Center for the Arts for the Arden Trio, premiered Ketchum, ID, January 2001
 Melody Competition (1999, rev. 2000) 21' – for percussion sextet 
 commissioned and premiered by red fishblue fish, Steven Schick, director; UCSD, La Jolla, CA, May 1999
 Dreams of a Dominant Culture (1997) 20' – for flute, clarinet, percussion, electric piano, violin, cello
 commissioned and premiered by Boston Musica Viva, Richard Pittman, conductor; Longy School, Cambridge, October 1997
 Eel Bone (1996) 13' – string quartet 
 commissioned and premiered by Kronos Quartet, San Francisco, May 1996
 Kebyar Maya (1995) 14' – cello octet 
 commissioned by Rockefeller Multi-Arts Program for Maya Beiser
 Be-In (1991) 11' – multiple versions: string quartet and bass clarinet/bassoon/double bass, clarinet, mandolin, cello, electric piano, double bass, hand percussion
 Bossa Nova for brass quintet (1991) 3' – commissioned by MIT for the inauguration of President Charles Vest
 Dog Dream (1990) 12' – flute, clarinet, percussion, piano, violin, cello, electric guitar
 commissioned and premiered by California EAR Unit, LA County Museum
 Ten String Quartets (1979) 10'

Non-standard ensembles 
 Sulvasutra (2006) 18' – string quartet, pipa, and tabla
 commissioned by the Silk Road Project
 Belle Labs (2006) 20' – violin, clarinet, and robotic xylophone (Heliphon)
 commissioned by Ensemble Robot and Boston Museum of Science, premiered January 25, 2005 by Evan Ziporyn and Todd Reynolds
 Thread (2005) 25' – clarinet, alto and bass flute, violin, cello
 commissioned and premiered by Dinosaur Annex, Cambridge, MA June 2005
 No Return (2002) 30' – 4 movements for violin, clarinet, and sounds of the Salmon River
 commissioned by Sun Valley Center for the Arts and premiered by Todd Reynolds and Evan Ziporyn, Ketchum, ID, January 2003
 More Songs About Telephones and Dogs (2002) 20' – 4 movements for mixed ensemble – 'Iris in Furs' 'Jubilee of Indifference' '...no messages...' 'Dog Heaven'
 commissioned by The Kitchen for Kitchen House Blend, premiered December 2002
Tight Fitting Garments 15' – violin and clarinet: "It Is And It Isn't," "Illusions of Purity," "Jubilee of Indifference"
 Serenity Now (1998) 5'
 commissioned by Chamber Music Conference of the East, Bennington, VT
 Pay Phone (1993) – violin, viola, electric guitar, bass clarinet, keyboard for the Michael Gordon Philharmonic
 Esto House (1993) 10' – violin, viola, electric guitar, bass clarinet, keyboard for the Michael Gordon Philharmonic
 Tree Frog (1990) 25' – bass clarinet, baritone saxophone, trombone, percussion, keyboard, violin; commissioned by Toronto Border Crossings Festival for Sound Pressure, premiered at the Music Gallery, Toronto, May 1990
 Twine (1985) 12' – three movements for soprano, two saxophones, bass clarinet, violin, viola, percussion
 LUVTime (1984) 15' – three movements for bass clarinet, baritone saxophone, trombone, percussion, piano

Works for one

Solo piano 

 In Bounds (2004)  
 Pondok (2000) 21' 
four movements – 'Fragrant Forest' (4:30), 'Tree Trunk' (3:45), 'Ginoman' (2:00), 'Gebyog (Husk)' (10:00)
commissioned and premiered by Sarah Cahill
 Fractal-Head (1987) 15'
 Some Coal, ten movements (1985) 30'
 The Water's Fine (1983) 30' – premiered by Michael Orland
 Weltscenen (1981) 20' – premiered by Christopher Oldfather

Solo pieces for other instruments 

 Hval (2007) – solo bass, commissioned by Robert Black
 Current Rate (1999) 15' – solo Chinese pipa and pre-recorded CD (or two pipa), commissioned and premiered by Wu Man at Bang on a Can Women and Music, Henry Street Settlement
 Kebyar Maya (1995) 14' – solo cello and prerecorded CD, commissioned by Rockefeller Multi-Arts Program for Maya Beiser
 Studies in Normative Behaviour, Vol 1 (1991) 10' – solo percussionist, commissioned and premiered by Danny Tunick
 The Motions (1990) 9' – solo viola (or viola and CD), premiered by John Lad
 China Spring (1991) 15' – for oboe and piano, commissioned and premiered by Peter Cooper and Evan Ziporyn

References

External links
 Evan Ziporyn Official Site
MIT Center for Art, Science & Technology (CAST)
Gamelan Galak Tika 
Eviyan 
Critical Band
Two (early) Interviews with Evan Ziporyn, August 18, 1989 & September 5, 1994

Listening
 Music by Ziporyn on his official site
 Ethel, "Be-in", Ethel (2003)

Published musical scores
 Schott EAM
 Airplane Ears Music

Bass clarinetists
MIT School of Humanities, Arts, and Social Sciences faculty
21st-century classical composers
Living people
Gamelan musicians
Musicians from Chicago
1959 births
Contemporary classical music performers
People from Lexington, Massachusetts
Musicians from Somerville, Massachusetts
American classical clarinetists
Classical musicians from Massachusetts
Classical musicians from Illinois
21st-century clarinetists